Jang Dong-Hyun (born March 19, 1982) is a South Korean footballer. Since 2008, he has played for Seongnam Ilhwa. Prior to that, he was with National Police Agency FC and Seongnam Ilhwa Chunma.

References

1982 births
Living people
South Korean footballers
Seongnam FC players
Association football forwards